Andrew Lee Fisher (born 12 February 1998) is an English professional footballer who plays as a goalkeeper for EFL Championship club Swansea City.

Club career

Blackburn Rovers
In January 2016 Fisher signed his first professional contract at Blackburn Rovers penning a two-and-a-half-year deal. On 29 August 2017 he made his first team debut, keeping a clean sheet in a 1–0 EFL Trophy group stage win over Stoke City U21. Two months later, Fisher signed an extended deal keeping him at the club until the summer of 2021. 

Over the following two seasons, Fisher found limited first team opportunities and was sent out on loan to FC United of Manchester, Northampton Town and Milton Keynes Dons.

Milton Keynes Dons
On 16 October 2020, Fisher re-joined former loan club Milton Keynes Dons on a permanent deal, eventually replacing Lee Nicholls as first choice goalkeeper under manager Russell Martin, and continued under Martin's successor, Liam Manning.

Swansea City
On 11 January 2022, Fisher joined Swansea City on a permanent four-and-a-half-year deal for an undisclosed fee in the region of £400,000.

Career statistics

Notes

References

External links
 

1998 births
Living people
Blackburn Rovers F.C. players
English Football League players
Association football goalkeepers
F.C. United of Manchester players
Northampton Town F.C. players
Milton Keynes Dons F.C. players
Swansea City A.F.C. players
English footballers